Tabor may refer to:

Places

Czech Republic
 Tábor, a town in the South Bohemian Region
 Tábor District, the surrounding district
 Tábor, a village and part of Velké Heraltice in the Moravian-Silesian Region

Israel
 Mount Tabor, Galilee, Israel, a Biblical site

Slovenia
 Municipality of Tabor
 Tabor, Tabor, a village in the municipality
 Tabor District, a city district of Maribor
 Tabor, Nova Gorica, a village
 Tabor, Sežana, a village
 Šilentabor, known as Tabor (nad Knežakom) until 2000

United States
 Tabor, Colorado, an unincorporated community
 Tabor, Illinois, an unincorporated community
 Tabor, Iowa, a city
 Tabor, Minnesota, an unincorporated community in the township
 Mount Tabor, Ohio, a former community also called Tabor
 Tabor, South Dakota, a town
 Tabor Township, Polk County, Minnesota
 Mount Tabor, Vermont, a town

Elsewhere
 Tabor, Victoria, Australia
 Tabor, Masovian Voivodeship, Poland, a village
 Tabor Island or Maria Theresa Reef

Schools
 Tabor Academy (disambiguation)
 Tabor College (disambiguation)
 Tabor Park Vocational School, Toronto, Canada

Churches
 Tabor Church (Berlin-Hohenschönhausen), Hohenschönhausen, Berlin, Germany
 Tabor Church, Kreuzberg, Berlin
 Tabor Church (Berlin-Wilhelmshagen), Berlin
 Tabor Congregational Church,  Iowa, US

People
 Tabor (surname), a list of people
 Stanisław Tatar (nom de guerre "Stanisław Tabor") (1896-1980), Polish Army general

Other uses
 Tabor Light, a light seen by Paul the Apostle in the doctrine of Eastern Orthodox theology
 Tabor (formation),  a camp
 Tabor (Martian crater)
 Tabor (Morocco), a type of a military unit
 Tabor (instrument), a snare drum
 Taxpayer Bill of Rights, a concept
 Tarrant Tabor, a British triplane bomber
 Tabor (character), in the animated television series Swat Kats
 "Tábor", the fifth symphonic poem in Smetana's Má vlast

See also
 Mount Tabor (disambiguation)
 
 Taborites
 Taber (disambiguation)
 Tavor (disambiguation)
 Three-hole pipe or tabor pipe, a wind musical instrument